The Embassy of Qatar at 1 South Audley Street in Mayfair, London is the diplomatic mission of Qatar in the United Kingdom. The embassy is housed in a Grade II listed three storey house designed by the architect Frederick Pepys Cockerell and completed after his death by George Aitchison.

The exterior of the house is richly decorated with a terracotta frieze depicting putti.

Qatar also maintains a Cultural and Military Section at 21 Hertford Street, Mayfair and a Health Section at 30 Collingham Gardens, South Kensington.

In 2013 there was a protest outside the embassy against the alleged mistreatment of migrant workers in Qatar.

Gallery

References

External links

Photo gallery of the embassy building
Information and photos of the embassy building

Qatar
Diplomatic missions of Qatar
Qatar
Grade II listed houses in the City of Westminster
Houses completed in 1879
Qatar–United Kingdom relations
Renaissance Revival architecture in the United Kingdom